"Surely" is a 1995 single by British pop group Five Star. The single was a U.S. only release, available in the UK as an import. Although it missed the Billboard Hot 100 chart, it peaked at number 125 in October of that year (see 1995 in music).

The song includes a rap by Junior P. This was the first time Five Star had used a rapper on one of their songs.

Track listing
Surely (Radio Mix)
Surely (Sure Funk)
Surely (Dub Mix)
Surely (Instrumental)
Surely (Album Version featuring Junior P)
Surely (Club Jam Mix featuring Junior P)

References

1995 singles
Five Star songs
Songs written by Delroy Pearson
Songs written by Doris Pearson